Kjell Ernst Viktor Ander (born 1902 - died 1992) was a Swedish entomologist. Ander was admitted as Doctor of Philosophy at Lund University in 1939. Ander worked as a docent at Lund University from 1937 to 1951.

References

1902 births
1992 deaths
Swedish entomologists
Academic staff of Lund University
20th-century Swedish zoologists